Magdeburg is the capital of the German state Saxony-Anhalt. The city is situated at the Elbe river.

Otto I, the first Holy Roman Emperor and founder of the Archdiocese of Magdeburg, was buried in the city's cathedral after his death. Magdeburg's version of German town law, known as Magdeburg rights, spread throughout Central and Eastern Europe. In the Late Middle Ages, Magdeburg was one of the largest and most prosperous German cities and a notable member of the Hanseatic League. One of the most notable people from the city is Otto von Guericke, famous for his experiments with the Magdeburg hemispheres.

Magdeburg experienced three major devastations in its history. In 1207 the first catastrophe struck the city, with a fire burning down large parts of the city, including the Ottonian cathedral. The Catholic League sacked Magdeburg in 1631, resulting in the death of 25,000 non-combatants, the largest loss of the Thirty Years' War. During World War II the Allies bombed the city in 1945 and destroyed much of the city centre.

After World War II, the city belonged to the German Democratic Republic from 1949 to 1990. Since then, many new construction projects were implemented and old buildings have been restored. In 2005 Magdeburg celebrated its 1.200th anniversary.

Magdeburg is situated on Autobahn 2 and Autobahn 14, and hence is at the connection point of the East (Berlin and beyond) with the West of Europe, as well as the North and South of Germany. For the modern city, the most significant industries are: the Machine industry, Healthcare industry, Mechanical engineering, Environmental technology, Circular economy, Logistics, Culture industry, Wood industry and the Information and communications technology.

There are numerous important cultural institutions in the city, including the Theater Magdeburg and the Museum of Cultural History.
Furthermore the city is the location of two universities, the Otto von Guericke University Magdeburg and the Magdeburg-Stendal University of Applied Sciences.

History

Early years

Founded by Charlemagne in 805 as Magadoburg (probably from Old High German magado for big, mighty and burga for fortress), the town was fortified in 919 by King Henry the Fowler against the Magyars and Slavs. In 929 King Otto I granted the city to his English-born wife Edith as dower. Queen Edith loved the town and often resided there; at her death she was buried in the crypt of the Benedictine abbey of Saint Maurice, later rebuilt as the cathedral. In 937, Magdeburg was the seat of a royal assembly. Otto I repeatedly visited Magdeburg, establishing a convent here about 937 and was later buried in the cathedral. He granted the abbey the right to income from various tithes and to corvée labour from the surrounding countryside.

The Archbishopric of Magdeburg was founded in 968 at the synod of Ravenna; Adalbert of Magdeburg was consecrated as its first archbishop. The archbishopric under Adalbert included the bishoprics of Havelberg, Brandenburg, Merseburg, Meissen and Naumburg-Zeitz. The archbishops played a prominent role in the German colonisation of the Slavic lands east of the Elbe river.

In 1035 Magdeburg received a patent giving the city the right to hold trade exhibitions and conventions. This formed the basis of German town law to become known as the Magdeburg rights. These laws were adopted and modified throughout Central and Eastern Europe. Visitors from many countries began to trade with Magdeburg. The town was burnt down in 1188.

In the 13th century, Magdeburg became a member of the Hanseatic League. With more than 20,000 inhabitants Magdeburg was one of the largest cities in the Holy Roman Empire. The town had active maritime commerce on the west (towards Flanders), with the countries of the North Sea, and maintained traffic and communication with the interior (for example Brunswick).

Reformation

The citizens constantly struggled against the archbishop, becoming nearly independent from him by the end of the 15th century. Around Easter 1497, the then twelve-year-old Martin Luther attended school in Magdeburg, where he was exposed to the teachings of the Brethren of the Common Life. In 1524, he was called to Magdeburg, where he preached and caused the city's defection from Roman Catholicism. The Protestant Reformation had quickly found adherents in the city, where Luther had been a schoolboy. Emperor Charles V repeatedly outlawed the unruly town, which had joined the League of Torgau and the Schmalkaldic League.

As it had not accepted the Augsburg Interim decree (1548), the city, by the emperor's commands, was besieged (1550–1551) by Maurice, Elector of Saxony, but it retained its independence. The rule of the archbishop was replaced by that of various administrators belonging to Protestant dynasties. In the following years, Magdeburg gained a reputation as a stronghold of Protestantism and became the first major city to publish the writings of Martin Luther. In Magdeburg, Matthias Flacius and his companions wrote their anti-Catholic pamphlets and the Magdeburg Centuries, in which they argued that the Roman Catholic Church had become the kingdom of the Antichrist.

In 1629 the city withstood its first siege during the Thirty Years' War, by Albrecht von Wallenstein, a Protestant convert to Catholicism. However, in 1631, imperial troops under Johann Tserclaes, Count of Tilly, stormed the city and massacred the inhabitants, killing about 20,000 and burning the city.

After the war, a population of only 4,000 remained. Under the Peace of Westphalia (1648), Magdeburg was to be assigned to Brandenburg-Prussia after the death of the administrator August of Saxe-Weissenfels, as the semi-autonomous Duchy of Magdeburg. This occurred in 1680.

The city made an astonishingly quick recovery, due especially to the energy and dedication of its mayor Otto von Guericke, who was also a noted scientist. Just six years after the end of the terribly destructive war, Magdeburg was the scene of the famous scientific experiment known as The Magdeburg hemispheres by which the existence of vacuum - hitherto hotly debated - was empirically proven, with enormous implications for the later developments of physics.

19th century
In the course of the Napoleonic Wars, the fortress surrendered to French troops in 1806. The city was annexed to the French-controlled Kingdom of Westphalia in the 1807 Treaty of Tilsit. King Jérôme appointed Count Heinrich von Blumenthal as mayor. In 1815, after the Napoleonic Wars, Magdeburg was made the capital of the new Prussian Province of Saxony.

20th century
In 1912, the old fortress was dismantled, and in 1908, the municipality Rothensee became part of Magdeburg.

Magdeburg was heavily bombed by British and American air forces during the Second World War. The RAF bombing raid on the night of 16 January 1945 destroyed much of the city centre. The death toll is estimated at 2,000–2,500. Near the end of World War II, the city of about 340,000 became capital of the Province of Magdeburg. Brabag's Magdeburg/Rothensee plant that produced synthetic oil from lignite coal was a target of the Oil Campaign of World War II. The impressive Gründerzeit suburbs north of the city, called the Nordfront, were destroyed as well as some of the city's main streets with its Baroque buildings.

It was occupied by 9th US Army troops on 18 April 1945 and was left to the Red Army on 1 July 1945. Post-war the area was part of the Soviet Zone of Occupation and many of the remaining pre-World War II city buildings were destroyed, with only a few buildings near the cathedral and in the southern part of the old city being restored to their pre-war state. Before the reunification of Germany, many surviving Gründerzeit buildings were left uninhabited and, after years of degradation, waiting for demolition. 
From 1949 until German reunification on 3 October 1990, Magdeburg belonged to the German Democratic Republic.

Since German reunification
In 1990 Magdeburg became the capital of the new state of Saxony-Anhalt within reunified Germany. Huge parts of the city and its centre were also rebuilt in a modern style. Its economy is one of the fastest-growing in the former East German states.

In 2005 Magdeburg celebrated its 1200th anniversary.

The city was hit by 2013 European floods. Authorities declared a state of emergency and said they expected the Elbe river to rise higher than in 2002.

Intel will build its largest plant in Europe in the south of the city by 2027.

Geography
Magdeburg is one of the major towns along the Elbe Cycle Route (Elberadweg).

Districts
The city of Magdeburg is divided into 40 Stadtteile (districts). Three of these, the former municipalities Beyendorf-Sohlen, Pechau and Randau-Calenberge, have a special status as Ortschaften. The Stadtteile of Magdeburg are:

Climate
Magdeburg has a Humid continental climate (Dfb) bordering on an oceanic climate (Cfb) according to Köppen climate classification.

Demographics

Population development
Population development since 1400:

Politics

Mayor

The current mayor of Magdeburg is independent politician Simone Borris since 2022. The most recent mayoral election was held on 24 April 2022, with a runoff held on 8 May, and the results were as follows:

! rowspan=2 colspan=2| Candidate
! rowspan=2| Party
! colspan=2| First round
! colspan=2| Second round
|-
! Votes
! %
! Votes
! %
|-
| bgcolor=| 
| align=left| Simone Borris
| align=left| Independent (FDP, future!, MUT)
| 33,065
| 44.3
| 39,201
| 64.8
|-
| bgcolor=| 
| align=left| Jens Rösler
| align=left| SPD/Greens
| 20,080
| 26.3
| 21,298
| 35.2
|-
| bgcolor=| 
| align=left| Tobias Krull
| align=left| Christian Democratic Union
| 9,327
| 12.2
|-
| bgcolor=| 
| align=left| Nicole Anger
| align=left| The Left
| 5,230
| 6.8
|-
| bgcolor=| 
| align=left| Frank Pasemann
| align=left| Alternative for Germany
| 3,802
| 5.0
|-
| bgcolor=| 
| align=left| Till Isenhuth
| align=left| Independent
| 1,676
| 2.2
|-
| bgcolor=| 
| align=left| Sarah Biedermann
| align=left| Free Voters
| 1,289
| 1.7
|-
| bgcolor=| 
| align=left| Bettina Fassl
| align=left| Animal Protection Alliance
| 1,103
| 1.4
|-
| bgcolor=| 
| align=left| André Jordan
| align=left| Die PARTEI
| 860
| 1.1
|-
! colspan=3| Valid votes
! 76,432
! 99.6
! 60,508
! 99.4
|-
! colspan=3| Invalid votes
! 302
! 0.4
! 340
! 0.6
|-
! colspan=3| Total
! 76,734
! 100.0
! 60,848
! 100.0
|-
! colspan=3| Electorate/voter turnout
! 189,916
! 40.4
! 189,471
! 32.1
|-
| colspan=7| Source: City of Magdeburg
|}

City council
The most recent city council election was held on 26 May 2019, and the results were as follows:

! colspan=2| Party
! Votes
! %
! +/-
! Seats
! +/-
|-
| bgcolor=| 
| align=left| Christian Democratic Union (CDU)
| 55,969
| 18.6
|  6.6
| 10
|  4
|-
| bgcolor=| 
| align=left| Social Democratic Party (SPD)
| 50,794
| 16.9
|  8.5
| 9
|  5
|-
| bgcolor=| 
| align=left| Alliance 90/The Greens (Grüne)
| 46,127
| 15.4
|  4.8
| 9
|  3
|-
| bgcolor=| 
| align=left| The Left (Die Linke)
| 45,922
| 15.3
|  6.9
| 9
|  4
|-
| bgcolor=| 
| align=left| Alternative for Germany (AfD)
| 43,200
| 14.4
|  9.6
| 8
|  5
|-
| bgcolor=| 
| align=left| Free Democratic Party (FDP)
| 16,157
| 5.4
|  2.1
| 3
|  1
|-
| 
| align=left| Magdeburg Garden Party (Gartenpartei)
| 12,709
| 4.2
|  2.3
| 2
|  1
|-
| bgcolor=| 
| align=left| Human Environment Animal Protection (Tierschutzpartei)
| 9,871
| 3.3
|  1.2
| 2
|  1
|-
| 
| align=left| future!
| 8,651
| 2.9
|  0.9
| 2
|  1
|-
| 
| align=left| Alliance for Magdeburg (BfM)
| 4,384
| 1.5
|  0.1
| 1
| ±0
|-
| bgcolor=| 
| align=left| Alliance for Human Rights, Animal and Nature Protection (Tierschutzallianz)
| 4,061
| 1.4
|  1.0
| 1
|  1
|-
| colspan=7 bgcolor=lightgrey| 
|-
| bgcolor=| 
| align=left| Die PARTEI
| 2,548
| 0.8
| New
| 0
| New
|-
! colspan=2| Total
! 300,393
! 100.0
! 
! 
! 
|-
! colspan=2| Valid votes
! 101,994
! 98.5
! 
! 
! 
|-
! colspan=2| Invalid votes
! 1,547
! 1.5
! 
! 
! 
|-
! colspan=2| Total
! 103,541
! 100.0
! 
! 56
! ±0
|-
! colspan=2| Electorate/voter turnout
! 193,826
! 53.4
!  15.1
! 
! 
|-
| colspan=7| Source: City of Magdeburg
|}

Education

The Otto-von-Guericke University Magdeburg (German: Otto-von-Guericke-Universität Magdeburg) was founded in 1993 and is one of the newest universities in Germany. The university in Magdeburg has about 13,000 students in nine faculties. There are 11,700 papers published in international journals from this institute.

The Magdeburg-Stendal University of Applied Sciences was founded in 1991. There are 30 direct study programs in five departments in Magdeburg and two departments in Stendal. The university has more than 130 professors and approximately 4,500 students at Magdeburg and 1,900 at Stendal.

Culture and architecture

Entertainment
Magdeburg has a municipal theatre, Theater Magdeburg.

Magdeburg is well known for its Christmas market, which is an attraction for 1.5 million visitors every year. Other events are the Stadtfest, Christopher Street Day, Elbe in Flames, and the Europafest Magdeburg. The autumn fair (formerly men's fair) of Magdeburg goes back to Germany's oldest folk festival. The tradition dates back to September 1010, when the holy feast of the Theban Legion was celebrated in Magdeburg (then called Magathaburg).

Event venues

 Altes Theater am Jerichower Platz – Former theater, used for parties and large conferences
 AMO – Culture and congress building
 Buttergasse - Night club near the city centre at "Alter Markt" – house-, electro, pop and black music
 Cathedral of Magdeburg
 Concert hall Georg Philipp Telemann at "Kloster unser lieben Frauen"
 Factory – Former factory building, German and international pop, rock, metal, and indie music artists are featured
 Festung Mark – Part of the former city fortification, now reconstructed for parties and conventions
 Feuerwache – Former fire station, repurposed for events
 GETEC Arena – Biggest multi-purpose hall in Saxony-Anhalt, home of handball team SC Magdeburg
 halber85 - Conventions, partys, conferences
 Kunstkantine – Factory cafeteria, monthly electro-music parties
 MDCC-Arena – Home of 1. FC Magdeburg
 Messe Magdeburg - Official trade fair site
 Paulus Church
 Prinzzclub – Night club at Halberstädter Straße – house-, electro, and black music
 Seebühne at Elbauenpark
 Stadthalle – Concert hall
 Studentenclub Baracke - Night club especially for students - house-, electro, rock, pop, indie and black music
 St. Johannis Church
 St. Petri Church, with stained glass by Charles Crodel
 Tessenow Loft - Conventions, partys, conferences

Museums
 Magdeburg Museum of Cultural History
 Otto-von-Guericke-Museum Lukasklause
 Jahrtausendturm
 Magdeburg Museum of Nature
 Magdeburg Museum of Technology
 Art Museum in the Monastery of Our Lady
 Magdeburg Circus Museum
 Magdeburg Hairdressing Museum
 Steamboat Württemberg - a museum ship

Architecture

Cathedral

It is notable for its beautiful and unique sculptures, especially the "Twelve Virgins" at the Northern Gate, the depictions of Otto I the Great and his wife Editha as well as the statues of St Maurice and St Catherine. 
The predecessor of the cathedral was a church built in 937 within an abbey, called St. Maurice. Emperor Otto I the Great was buried here beside his wife in 973. St. Maurice burnt to ashes in 1207. The exact location of that church remained unknown for a long time.

The construction of the new church lasted 300 years. The cathedral of Saints Catherine and Maurice was the first Gothic church building in Germany. The building of the steeples was completed as late as 1520.

While the cathedral was virtually the only building to survive the massacres of the Thirty Years' War, it suffered damage in World War II. It was soon rebuilt and completed in 1955.

The square in front of the cathedral (also called the Neuer Markt, or "new marketplace") was occupied by an imperial palace (Kaiserpfalz), which was destroyed in the fire of 1207. The stones from the ruin were used for the building of the cathedral. The presumed remains of the palace were excavated in the 1960s.

Other sights
 Unser Lieben Frauen Monastery (Our Lady), 11th century, containing the church of St. Mary. Today a museum for Modern Art. Home of the National Collection of Small Art Statues of the GDR (Nationale Sammlung Kleinkunstplastiken der DDR).
 The Magdeburger Reiter ("Magdeburg Rider", 1240), the first free-standing equestrian sculpture north of the Alps. It probably depicts the Emperor Otto I.
 City hall (1698). This building had stood on the market place since the 13th century, but it was destroyed in the Thirty Years' War; the new city hall was built in a Renaissance style influenced by Dutch architecture. It was renovated and re-opened in Oct 2005.
 Landtag; the seat of the government of Saxony-Anhalt with its Baroque façade built-in 1724.
 Monuments depicting Otto von Guericke (1907), Eike von Repkow and Friedrich Wilhelm von Steuben.
 Ruins of the greatest fortress of the former Kingdom of Prussia.
 Rotehorn-Park
 Elbauenpark containing the highest wooden structure in Germany.
St. Sebastian's Cathedral, the seat of the Roman Catholic Diocese of Magdeburg.
 St. John Church (Johanniskirche)
 The Gruson-Gewächshäuser, a botanical garden within a greenhouse complex
 The Magdeburg Water Bridge, Europe's longest water bridge
 "Die Grüne Zitadelle" or The Green Citadel of Magdeburg, a large, pink building of a modern architectural style designed by Friedensreich Hundertwasser and completed in 2005.
 Jerusalem Bridge
 Zoo Magdeburg

Sports 

Magdeburg has a proud history of sports teams, with Association Football proving the most popular. 1. FC Magdeburg currently plays in the 2. Bundesliga, the second division of German football. They are the only East German football club to have won the UEFA Cup Winners' Cup. The now-defunct clubs SV Victoria 96 Magdeburg and Cricket Viktoria Magdeburg were among the first football clubs in Germany.

There is also the very successful handball team, SC Magdeburg. They won multiple times the Handball-Bundesliga (HBL), DHB-Pokal, DHB-Supercup, EHF European League, EHF Champions League, EHF Men's Champions Trophy and the IHF Men's Super Globe.

The discus was re-discovered in Magdeburg in the 1870s by Christian Georg Kohlrausch, a gymnastics teacher.

Twin towns – sister cities

Magdeburg is twinned with:

 Sarajevo, Bosnia and Herzegovina (1977)
 Braunschweig, Germany (1987)
 Nashville, United States (2003)
 Zaporizhzhia, Ukraine (2008)
 Radom, Poland (2008)
 Harbin, China (2008)
 Le Havre, France (2011)

People

A–K

Ernst Anders (1845–1911), portrait and genre painter
Richard Assmann (1845–1918), meteorologist
Theodor Avé-Lallemant (1806–1890), music critic and writer on music
Alfons Bach, (1904–1999), industrial designer
Kurt Behrens (1884–1928), springboard diver
Arno Bieberstein (1884–1918), swimmer
Jessica Böhrs (born 1980), actress and singer
Henry Busse (1894–1955), trumpeter and bandleader, emigrated to the US at 18
Adelbert Delbrück (1822–1890), banker and lawyer
Friedrich Ernst Fesca (1789–1826), violinist and composer
Hans Gericke (1912–2014), architect
Frank Giering (1971–2010), actor
Harry Giese (1903–1991), actor and spokesman in Nazi newsreels
Georg Gradnauer (1866–1946), newspaper editor and politician
Alfred Grünberg (1901–1942), worker, KPD member and resistance fighter against Nazism
Otto von Guericke (1602–1686), mayor and inventor of the Magdeburg hemispheres. The Otto von Guericke University Magdeburg is named after him
Carl Gustav Friedrich Hasselbach (1809–1882), mayor and member of the Prussian House of Lords; a square in the centre of Magdeburg is named after him
Ulrike Helzel, soprano
Gottlieb von Haeseler (1701–1752), entrepreneur in the Duchy of Magdeburg
Ingolf Huhn (born 1955), theatre and opera manager
Hartmann Wilhem Otto (1876–1960), immigrated to the US, where he changed his name to William Hartman and served as a Rough Rider in the Spanish–American War together with Theodore Roosevelt
Christian Georg Kohlrausch (1851–1934), gymnastics teacher and re-discoverer of discus throwing
Carl Hindenburg (1820–1899), cycling official and first president of the German Cyclist Federation (DRB)
Heinrich Jost (1889–1948), typeface designer
Eberhard Jüngel (1934–2021), German Lutheran theologian
Georg Kaiser (1878–1945), writer
Nadine Kleinert (born 1975), retired shot putter, Olympic and World Championship silver medallist
Wilhelm Kobelt (1865–1927), member of the Reichstag and local politician in Magdeburg
Rolf Kohnert (born 1938), engineer, 3 times Australian masters cycling champion
Stefan Kretzschmar (born 1973), handball player and Olympic medallist
Hans Kühne (1880–1969), chemist on the board of I.G. Farben and defendant during the Nuremberg trials

L–Z

Ernst Lehmann (1908–1945), SPD politician, active in the resistance against Nazism
Otto Lehmann (1900–1936), resistance fighter against Nazism
Werner Marcks (1896–1967), lieutenant general in World War II
Olaf Malolepski (born 1946), singer-songwriter
Johann Carl Simon Morgenstern (1770–1852), philologist who coined the term Bildungsroman
Felix von Niemeyer (1820–1871), physician, royal Württemberg personal physician
Leo Nowak (born 1929), Roman Catholic bishop of Magdeburg (1990–2004)
Christiane Nüsslein-Volhard (born 1942), biologist, the Albert Lasker Award for Basic Medical Research in 1991 and the Nobel Prize in Physiology or Medicine in 1995
Richard Ölze (1900–1980), painter
Erich Ollenhauer (1901–1963), leader of the Social Democratic Party of Germany 1952–1963
Menahem Pressler (born 1923), pianist
Ernst Reuter (1889–1953), Mayor of Magdeburg 1931–1933, then Mayor of West Berlin in 1948–1953
Willy Rosen (1894–1944) composer and songwriter
Arthur Ruppin (1876–1943), Zionist thinker and leader
Ekkehard Schall (1930–2005), actor and theatre director
Marcel Schmelzer (born 1988), footballer
Karl Schmidt (1902–1945), resistance fighter against Nazism
Petra Schmidt-Schaller (born 1980), actress
Manfred Schoof (born 1936), jazz trumpeter
Wolfgang Schreyer (1927–2017), writer
Margarete Schön (1895–1985), stage and film actress
Ivan Shyshkin (born 1983), Ukrainian footballer
Kurt Singer (1886–1962), philosopher
Friedrich Wilhelm von Steuben (1730–1794), American patriot
Christoph Christian Sturm (1740–1786), preacher and author, wrote the majority of his devotional works here
Bruno Taut (1880–1938), city architect 1921–1923, completed two housing projects in Magdeburg
Georg Philipp Telemann (1681–1767), composer
Klaus Thunemann (born 1937), bassoon professor
Henning von Tresckow (1901–1944), major general in the Wehrmacht, active in the military resistance
Lothar von Trotha (1848–1920), military commander notorious for presiding over the near-extermination of the Herero in German South-West Africa
Karl Wallenda (1905–1978), highwire acrobat
Camillo Walzel (1829–1895), librettist and theatre director
Wilhelm Weitling (1808–1871), utopian Communist
Dieter Zahn (born 1940), double-bassist
Dejan Zavec (born 1976), Slovenian welterweight boxer, IBF Welterweight Champion
Heinrich Zschokke (1771–1848), author and reformer
George William Ziemann (1809–1881), Christian missionary who served in Magdeburg in the infantry

Gallery

See also

 The Magdeburg hemispheres, an experimental apparatus used to demonstrate the force of atmospheric pressure in 1656 by scientist Otto von Guericke
 Timeline of Magdeburg

References

External links

 Official website 
 Website for tourists
 Virtual city tour Magdeburg
 The city of Otto

 
German state capitals
Martin Luther
Members of the Hanseatic League
Populated riverside places in Germany
Populated places on the Elbe